The seventh season of Greece's Next Top Model (abbreviated as GNTMgr), premiered on September 19, 2022 and is the fifth season to air on Star Channel. Vicky Kaya returned as the show's head judge after marking her absence in the previous cycle. The season introduced a diverse all-female cast.

The prizes for this season included a contract with Dust & Cream cosmetics, a 2-year scholarship with IEK Alfa academy, a jewelry set from Georg Jensen worth €20,000, a brand new Citroën Ami and a cash prize of €50,000.

The winner of the competition was 19-year-old Aléksia Trajko.

Cast

Contestants
(Ages stated are at start of contest)

Judges
 Vicky Kaya
 Anastasios Sofroniou
 Yiorgos Karavas
 Sophia Hadjipanteli (Auditions only)

Other cast members
 Mary Vitinaros – model instructor
 Christos Birbas – coach

Episode summaries

Episodes 1–5: Auditions
The show kicked off with the audition phase. Auditions took place in two different cities: Athens and Thessaloniki. The auditions aired for the first episodes of the show. During the auditions, the girls had a brief interview with the judges while they also walked in swimwear, if asked. In order to advance, they needed a "yes" from at least 3 of the judges.

Episodes 5–6: Bootcamp

First Part: ID catwalk

Second Part: Photoshoot

Golden Pass Winner: Katya Kizima
Featured photographer: Kostas Sapounis

Episode 7: Wuthering Heights
Original airdate: 

Quit: Anna Venetsaki
Entered: Nagia Kontostergiou
First call-out: Aléksia Trajko
Bottom two: Katerina Kara & Myria Kyriakidou
Eliminated: Katerina Kara
Featured photographer: Ioanna Tzetzoumi

Episode 8: Drive-Thru Diner
Original airdate: 

First call-out: Yeva Bondarénko
Bottom two: Despoina Sarri & Nagia Kontostergiou
Eliminated: Nagia Kontostergiou
Featured photographer: Mike Tsitas

Episode 9: Tennis
Original airdate: 

Quit: Efi Bandi & Evelina Petrougaki
First call-out: Nikol Tsoulos
Featured photographer: Angelos Dristelas

Episode 10: Four Seasons Catwalk
Original airdate: 

First call-out: Myria Kyriakidou
Bottom two: Elena Lysandrou & Yeva Bondarénko
Eliminated: Elena Lysandrou
Featured photographer: Dimitris Kleanthous

Episode 11: Get The Job Done
Original airdate: 

Quit: Alexia Kouvela & Nikol Tsoulos
First call-out: Mikaela Novak-Marli 
Featured photographer: Marios Sagias

Episode 12: Fashion In The City
Original airdate: 

First call-out: Yeva Bondarénko
Bottom two: Despoina Sarri & Julia Iligenko
Eliminated: Julia iligenko
Featured photographer: George Angelis

Episode 13: The Makeover
Original airdate: 

The contestants received their makeovers. There was no panel held.

Entered: Dorela Geka, Eirini Andoniou, Georgianna Ioakeimidou & Rafaela Charalambous
Featured photographer: Panagiotis Katsos

Episode 14: Bikini Debate
Original airdate: 

First call-out: Coty Gougousi-Camacho & Maria Costa
Bottom two: Dorela Geka & Victoria Muroforidou
Eliminated: Dorela Geka
Featured photographer: Joey Leo

Episode 15: Back To The Future
Original airdate: 

First call-out: Grigoriana Plyta
Bottom two: Yeva Bondarénko & Zoe Ioannidou
Eliminated: Yeva Bondarénko
Featured Photographer: Olga Tzimou

Episode 16: Alive & Kicking
Original airdate: 

First call-out: Victoria Muroforidou
Bottom two: Despoina Sarri & Rafaela Charalambous
Eliminated: Despoina Sarri
Featured Photographer: Christos Theologou

Episode 17: Make Me Wet
Original airdate: 

First call-out: Rafaela Charalambous
Bottom two: Aléksia Trajko & Zoe Ioannidou
Eliminated: Zoe Ioannidou
Featured Photographer: Vaggelis Xafinis

Episode 18: Sail Away
Original airdate: 

First call-out: Coty Gougousi-Camacho 
Bottom two: Katya Kizima & Maria Costa
Eliminated: Katya Kizima
Featured Photographer: Nikos Vardakastanis

Episode 19: Shine On
Original airdate: 

First call-out: Mara Marli
Bottom two: Eirini Andoniou & Rafaela Charalambous
Eliminated: Rafaela Charalambous
Featured Photographer: Panos Giannakopoulos

Episode 20: Dirty Ride
Original airdate: 

First call-out: Myria Kyriakidou
Bottom two: Maria Costa & Victoria Muroforidou
Eliminated: Maria Costa
Featured Photographer: Spyros Chamalis

Episode 21: Glam Wars
Original airdate: 

First call-out: Marita Kathitzioti
Bottom two: Eirini Andoniou & Victoria Muroforidou
Eliminated: Eirini Andoniou
Featured Photographer: Petros Toufexis

Episode 22: Recycle Queen
Original airdate: 

First call-out: Myria Kyriakidou
Bottom two: Grigoriana Plyta & Marita Kathitzioti
Eliminated: Grigoriana Plyta
Featured Photographer: Antonis Agridopoulos

Episode 23: Vamos Nammos
Original airdate: 

First call-out: Mikaela Novak-Marli
Bottom two: Georgianna Ioakeimidou & Mara Marli
Eliminated: Georgianna Ioakeimidou
Featured Photographers: Panagiotis Katsos, Apostolos Koukousas

Episode 24: The After Party Effect
Original airdate: 

Returned: Katya Kizima & Rafaela Charalambous
First call-out: Victoria Muroforidou
Bottom two: Aléksia Trajko & Rafaela Charalambous
Eliminated: Rafaela Charalambous 
Featured Photographer: Dimitris Kleanthous

Episode 25: Transparency
Original airdate: 

First call-out: Coty Gougousi-Camacho
Bottom two: Katya Kizima & Mara Marli
Eliminated: Katya Kizima
Featured Photographer: Panagiotis Simopoulos

Episode 26: Rich Girl & Her Strange Pet
Original airdate: 

First call-out: Marita Kathitzioti
Bottom two: Mikaela Novak-Marli & Victoria Muroforidou
Eliminated: Mikaela Novak-Marli
Featured Photographer: Aggelos Potamianos

Episode 27: Driver's Seat
Original airdate: 

First call-out: Victoria Muroforidou
Bottom two: Coty Gougousi-Camacho & Myria Kyriakidou
Eliminated: Myria Kyriakidou
Featured Photographer: Kosmas Koumianos

Episode 28: Trip To Rome
Original airdate: 

First call-out: Marita Kathitzioti
Bottom two: Mara Marli & Victoria Muroforidou
Eliminated: Mara Marli
Featured Photographers: Panagiotis Katsos, Stratis Kas

Episode 29: Catwalk, Cabaret - Final Part 1
Original airdate: 

Final four: Aleksia Traiko, Coty Gougousi-Camacho, Marita Kathitzioti & Victoria Muroforidou 
Injured: Coty Gougousi-Camacho
Featured Photographer: Bill Georgousis

Episode 30: Video Clip - Final Part 2
Original airdate: 

Final three: Aléksia Trajko, Marita Kathitzioti & Victoria Muroforidou
Third place: Victoria Muroforidou 
Runner-up: Marita Kathitzioti
Winner: Aléksia Trajko

Results

 The contestant quit the competition
 The contestant was eliminated
 The contestant was absent at panel but was deemed safe
 The contestants were put through collectively to the next round
 The contestant won the competition

Bottom two

 The contestant quit the competition
 The contestant was eliminated after their first time in the bottom two
 The contestant was eliminated after their second time in the bottom two
 The contestant was eliminated after their third time in the bottom two
 The contestant Quit the competition due to an injury
 The contestant was eliminated in the final judging and placed third
 The contestant was eliminated in the final judging and placed as the runner-up

Average  call-out order
Episode 11 (except top two), 13, 29 & 30 are not included.

Notes

Photo shoots
Episode 6 photo shoot: Posing with a treadmill in lingerie (semifinals)
Episode 7 photo shoot: Wuthering Heights
Episode 8 photo shoot: Drive-Thru Diner
Episode 9 photo shoot: Tennis
Episode 10 photo shoot: Four Seasons Catwalk
Episode 11 photo shoot: Get The Job Done
Episode 12 photo shoot: Fashion In The City
Episode 13 photo shoot: The Makeover
Episode 14 photo shoot: Bikini Debate
Episode 15 photo shoot: Back To The Future
Episode 16 photo shoot: Alive & Kicking
Episode 17 photo shoot: Make Me wet
Episode 18 photo shoot: Sail Away
Episode 19 photo shoot: Shine On
Episode 20 photo shoot: Dirty Ride
Episode 21 photo shoot: Glam Wars
Episode 22 photo shoot: Recycle Queen
Episode 23 photo shoot: Vamos Nammos
Episode 24 photo shoot: The After Party Effect
Episode 25 photo shoot: Transparency
Episode 26 photo shoot: Rich Girl & Her Strange Pet
Episode 27 photo shoot: Driver's Seat
Episode 28 photo shoot: Trip To Rome
Episode 29 photo shoot: Cabaret
Episode 30 commercial: Dust & Cream crimson lipstick

Ratings

Notes

  Outside top 20.
  Outside top 10.

References

External links
 Official website (ANT1)
 Official website (Star Channel)

Greece
2022 Greek television seasons